Legislative elections were held Guam on November 8, 2022, along with the election for the Guam delegate to the U.S. House of Representatives. Before the election, the Democratic Party holds eight of the fifteen seats in the Legislature while the Republican Party holds seven seats. The election resulted in a gain of one seat for the Democrats and a loss of one seat for Republicans. Republicans have won the race for Guam's US House Delegate for the first time since 1993.

Candidates

Democratic

Declared

Declined

Republican

Declared

Declined

Disqualified

Primary Election 
Primary elections in Guam were held on August 27, 2022. The top 15 candidates who receive the highest votes for each party will move on to the general election.

Results

Democratic primary results

Eliminated candidates 
Six Democrats hopefuls were eliminated in the 2022 primaries:

 Roy L. Gamboa
 Alexander M. Duenas
 John Anaich II
 David R. Duenas
 Franklin J. Meno
 Armando S. Dominguez

Republican Party Primary

Eliminated candidates 
One Republican hopeful was eliminated in the 2022 primaries:

 Harvey Egna

General Election

Results 
The members of the legislature are elected at-large with the first 15 winning candidates elected as the new members of the legislature. The Democratic Party picked up one seat from Republicans, leaving the composition for the next legislature at 9 Democrats and 6 Republicans. Despite Democrats remaining the majority in the legislature, Republicans took the Delegate seat for the first time since 1993 with James C. Moylan winning the race.

Incoming Senators to the 37th Guam Legislature 
There were 15 senators elected on November 8, 2022 to serve in the 37th Guam Legislature and will be inaugurated in January 2023:

Democratic

Incumbents

Freshman

Republican

Incumbents

Freshman

References 

Legislative
Legislative elections in Guam